Digambara Jaina Temple is a Jain temple in Bhubaneswar, in the state of Odisha, India. The temple is on the top of Khandagiri hill. This hill is honeycombed with a series of rock-cut Jaina caves, commissioned by King Kharavela in the 1st century BCE. The rock-cut caves are protected by Archaeological Survey of India. The enshrining deities are a series of Jaina tirthankara images.

History 
The architecture of the temple suggest that it was built out of materials from an earlier temple. According to local legends the temple was consrctured by Mahameghavahana ruler Kharavela in the 1st century BCE. This legend is not supported by the architectural features. According to Alexander Cunningham, The temple structure is estimated to have been built during the rule of Maratha Empire based on architecture design. The current structure was built in first quarter of the 19th century.

Architurecture 
This temple is built in Pidha style with Vimana and Jaga mohan following the Kalinga architecture.
The temple is built using sandstone in Ashlar fashion with triratha plan and tri-anga bada elevation. The vimana and jagamohana features balustrade windows with vimana follows a square plan and Jaga mohan follows a rectangular plan. The architectural motifs such as khakharamundis and pidhamundis in the lower and upper janghas respectively.

The temple complex consist of three temple, first temple houses a colossal black stone idol of Parshvanatha in a white marble hall.The main shrine houses a white marble idol of Mahavira along with a large number of Jain idols. The third shrines houses 5 images of Jain tirthankara.

Conservation 
The temple is maintained by the Bengal, Bihar and Odisha Digambara Jaina Tirthankara Committee. Bimala Devi Jain is the local caretaker.

See also 

 Udayagiri and Khandagiri Caves
 Somavamshi dynasty

References

Citations

Sources 
  
  
 Pradhan, Sadasiba (2009). Lesser Known Monuments Of Bhubaneswar. Bhubaneswar: Lark Books. pp. 1–2. .
 

Tourist attractions in Bhubaneswar
Jain temples in Odisha
Buildings and structures completed in the 12th century
12th-century establishments in India
12th-century Jain temples